Sam O'Dea (born 24 November 1990) is a New Zealand beach volleyball player.

Sam and his brother Ben O'Dea represented New Zealand at the 2018 Commonwealth Games, where they won the bronze medal in the men's pair competition. They were the nation's first men's beach volleyball team to compete at the Games. The pair also won the bronze medal at the Shepparton Open in Australia on the 2017 FIVB Beach Volleyball World Tour.

O'Dea is the grandson of Bob O'Dea, who played rugby union for the New Zealand national team, the All Blacks, in the 1950s.

References

External links
 
 
 

1990 births
Living people
Men's beach volleyball players
New Zealand beach volleyball players
Beach volleyball players at the 2018 Commonwealth Games
Commonwealth Games bronze medallists for New Zealand
Commonwealth Games competitors for New Zealand
Beach volleyball players at the 2022 Commonwealth Games